Phadiara is a town located in the Punjab province of Pakistan. It is located in Lahore District at 31°14'40N 73°11'30E with an altitude of 175 metres (577 feet). Neighbouring settlements include Manak, Singh Khalsa and Gobindsar.

References

Populated places in Lahore District